Dig Comics is an American documentary film written and directed by Miguel Cima. It won an award for Best Documentary at the Comic Con International Film Festival, in 2009. The short film advocates for the comic book art form in the United States, and encourages the viewers to read more comic books.

Synopsis 
Cima, an avid comic book advocate and filmmaker, embarks on a journey to win fans for this print medium.  In doing so, he explains the reasons for the steady loss of readership in the US over the last 60 years, and questions why this originally American art form flourishes more successfully in France, Japan, the Netherlands and Germany.

Cima interviews experts, artists, distributors, fans and nonreaders to provide a wide perspective on the challenges affecting the industry. He conducts random man-on-the-street interviews, as well as talks with comic book enthusiasts, about the relegation of printed comic books to a niche market while big Hollywood films earn billions from comic book spin-offs. The scope of the documentary is broadened with a historic take on the genre.  A cross-cultural comparative explores the evolution of comic book readership in countries such as France and Japan, from the last century until the present.

History 

Dig Comics was conceived by writer and director Miguel Cima, and shot on location in Los Angeles, California. Further produced clips and videos were also shot in Los Angeles as well as Paris, France.

After the film's release in 2009, it was screened at a number of film festivals. It won the Best Documentary category at San Diego Comic Con International Film Festival, in 2009.

Reception 
Overall the documentary short was received positively. Actor and producer Edward James Olmos expressed support for the film.: Comics Alliance pointed out that high price of comic books in recent years and the increase in media channels competing for consumer dollars are not mentioned as possible factors contributing to the decline in sales.

Festivals and showcases 
Cannes Independent Film Festival, 2009
Los Angeles Downtown Film Festival, 2009
Vancouver, Canada International Film Festival, 2009
Tucson Film And Music Festival, 2009
Royal Flush Film Festival New York, 2009
Cannes American Pavilion Emerging Filmmaker Showcase, 2010
New Filmmakers LA at Sunset & Gower Film Festival, 2010
Bumbershoot Film Festival Seattle, 2010
Shockfest Film Festival of Hollywood, 2010
Long Island International Film Expo, 2010
Full Frame Documentary Festival, 2010
Fear No Film Festival, 2010
Action On Film International Film Festival, 2010
Moving Image Film Festival, 2010

References

External links 
Official website
Dig Comics at the Internet Movie Database

2009 films
2009 documentary films
Documentary films about comics
2000s English-language films